Clemens Kalischer (March 30, 1921 – June 9, 2018) was an American photojournalist and art photographer. He was born in Germany and immigrated to the United States.

His series of photographs of displaced persons arriving in New York City from displaced persons camps in post-World War II Europe, taken in 1947 and 1948, was his most recognized work.

Life and work
Kalischer was born in Lindau, Germany. He immigrated to France via Switzerland (1933) and then to the United States via Morocco (1942). His family fled from Berlin in 1933 and settled in Paris. He was taken prisoner in France in 1939 and survived three years of forced labor in eight different work camps (1939–1942).  He was reunited with his father in the last camp and his family escaped to the U.S. with the aid of Varian Fry. From 1944 through 1946 he studied art at the Cooper Union. Since 1951, Kalischer lived in Stockbridge, Massachusetts. He married Angela Wottitz in 1956. They had two children.

Career
Kalischer was a member of ASPP (American Society of Picture Professionals); a member of One by One (an international dialogue group between survivors and perpetrators of the Holocaust) and worked as a freelance photographer of The New York Times, Newsweek, Life, Fortune, Du, The Sun, Yankee, Coronet, Country Journal, Moment, Vermont Life, In Context, Jubilee, Yes, Orion, Ploughshares, Common Ground, Architectural Forum, Places, Urban Design International, Progressive Architectural, and Time magazine.  His photograph of a little boy with his puppy at the base of apartment steps on the West Side, New York, was selected by Edward Steichen for the world-touring Museum of Modern Art exhibition The Family of Man exhibition, seen by 9 million visitors.  

His series of photographs of people arriving in New York City from displaced persons camps in post-World War II Europe, taken in 1947 and 1948, was his most recognized work. Many are included in Clemens Kalischer, edited by Denis Brudna and Norbert Bunge (Hatje Cantz). 

In 2009 he revealed that when in the 1950s he'd settled in Stockbridge that as a young photographer he had met Norman Rockwell who had a studio next door and had taken reference photographs for the artist.

The Image Gallery
In Stockbridge, Massachusetts, he opened a gallery in 1965, The Image Gallery, to represent new artists. The gallery is still open, showing works by Kalischer. His work spanned over 70 years of images. His freelance work focused on music (The Marlboro Music Festival, The Lenox School of Jazz, South Mountain Music Festival, Tanglewood, and many more), the arts (Black Mountain College, Pilobolus, The Flaherty Film Seminar, The Berkshire Theater Group, and many more), architecture, farming (CSA's, Italian Piedmont, slow-food movement, Vermont, and more), nature, portraiture, images form the U.S. south, urban and rural areas of the U.S., images from Europe, India, Cuba, and Israel. 

Kalischer died on June 9, 2018 in Lenox, Massachusetts, aged 97.

Books

La montagna dell'esodo. Racconti fotografici di Clemens Kalischer Museo Nazionale della Montagna, 1996. .
Clemens Kalischer. Marval, 2004. .
Clemens Kalischer New York - Photographien 1947-1959. 2000. By Sylvia Böhmer. .
Clemens Kalischer. Hatje Cantz, 2002. . Witn an introduction by Norbert Bunge and Denis Brudna.
Clemens Kalischer, Le Flux Du Quotidien. Musee de la Photographie Charleroi, Belgium. Catalogue.

Films
Fully Awake – Black Mountain College documentary by Cathryn Davis Zommer; 10 of Kalischer's photographs used
Music Inn – Documentary by Projectile Arts; about 200 of Kalischer's photographs photos used

Exhibitions

Solo exhibitions
Durham Art Center, North Carolina
Berkshire Museum, Pittsfield - 4 exhibits
McCullough House, Bennington, VT
Washington Art Association, Connecticut
Black Mountain College, North Carolina
ZONE, Springfield, MA
Brattleboro Museum, VT
La montagna dell'esodo. Racconti fotografici di Clemens Kalischer, Museo Nazionale della Montagna, Torino, Italy 1996
Argus Fotokunst art gallery, Berlin, Germany 1998, 2002, 2006
Photography Gallery Prospekto, Vilnius, Lithuania 2006
Estey Organ Co., Estey Organ Museum, Brattleboro, VT 2007
Retrospective, Maison Robert Doisneau, Gentilly, France 2007
KunstHaus Potsdam, Germany 2007
Displaced Persons: Photographs by Clemens Kalischer, Holocaust Museum Houston, Houston Texas 2010
Holocaust Museums South Africa (Cape Town, Durban and Johannesburg) 2012-2013
The German Emigration Museum, Bremerhaven, Germany 2014
The Lichtenstein Gallery, Pittsfield, MA
The Bennington Museum, Bennington, VT 2017

Group exhibitions

In & Out of Focus, Museum of Modern Art, New York, 1948
The Family of Man, Museum of Modern Art, New York, 1955
Man Alive, C.S. Exhibit, Wales
Camera as a Witness, Montreal Expo, Montreal, 1967
Exposition de la Photographie Francaise, Paris
Decordova Museum, Lincoln, MA
Carl Siembab Gallery, Boston
Photo Vision '75, Boston, 1975
Portrait of America, Smithsonian Institution
The Photographer and the City, Smithsonian Institution
Brattleboro Museum, Brattleboro, VT
FotoFest, Houston, TX, 2002
Willy-Brandt-Haus, Berlin, 2002
Altonaer Museum, Hamburg, 2002
Pilobolus, Hood Museum of Art Hanover, NH
Life is Stranger Than Fiction, Albertina Museum, Vienna, Austria, 2007
Rock'n Roll 1939-1959, Cartier Foundation, Paris, France, 2007

Collections

Kalischer's work is held in the following public collections:
Tate, London: 1 print (as of June 2018)
Metropolitan Museum of Art, New York: 3 prints (as of June 2018)
Brooklyn Museum, Brooklyn, NY
Library of Congress (Master Photographers), Washington, D.C.
Lawrence Art Museum Williams College, Williamstown, MA
Museum of Modern Art, New York
Bavarian Museum, Munich
International Museum of Photography, New York
The Minneapolis Institute of Art, Minneapolis
Museum of Jewish Heritage, New York
Diaspora Museum, Tel Aviv
International Center of Photography, New York
Hood Museum of Art, Dartmouth College, Hanover, NH
Maison Robert Doisneau, Paris, France
Sal Oppenheim Collection, Munich, Germany
Colby College, Waterville, ME
The German Emigration Museum, Bremerhaven, Germany
Museo Nazionale della Montagna, Torino, Italy

Grants

National Council of Churches
Experiment in International Living
Cambridge Seven Aquarium
Edwin Jaffe Foundation Grant for Holocaust Gathering
Frank Taplin Grant for "Institute for Urban Design"

References

External links

 
 Biography of Kalischer (argus fotokunst art gallery)
 Kalischer's exhibitions in the Argus Fotokunst art gallery
 Clemens Kalischer - Sguardi d'autore su luoghi e persone, Paraloup (Rittana, Cuneo - Italy)

1921 births
2018 deaths
German emigrants to the United States
American people of German-Jewish descent
People from Lindau
American photographers
German expatriates in France